Rajasthan State Road Transport Corporation (RSRTC) is a public transport company which provides bus services in the Indian state Rajasthan. It is headquartered in Jaipur, Rajasthan. The corporation was established by Government of Rajasthan on 1 October 1964 under the Road Transport Act 1950. RSRTC operates ordinary, express and deluxe services. It has 4100 buses in its fleet, 52 depots across Rajasthan and 3 depots outside the state i.e. Indore, Ahmedabad and Delhi. There are around 2230 routes covered which amount to 5437.74 lakh km per year. It carries around 9 lakh passengers per day to their destinations within and outside the state.
RSRTC operates services in Rajasthan and adjoining states of Haryana, Punjab, Delhi, Uttar Pradesh, Himachal Pradesh, Madhya Pradesh, Gujarat, Maharashtra, Uttarakhand, Jammu Kashmir and Chandigarh.
Ticket reservation is available at all bus stations free of charge.
Online ticket facility is available for Air conditioned, Deluxe, Semi-deluxe and express buses through Kiosks in Rajasthan as well as through RSRTC mobile application.

Facilities 
Other than CBS Jaipur On-line booking facility is available free of cost at RSRTC counter at Narayan Singh Circle Jaipur. For Member of Parliament, Legislative Assembly, Ladies and for Handicapped People RSRTC has reserved special quota seat in each service. At 27 major bus stands like Jaipur, Ajmer, Jodhpur, Kota, Bikaner, Udaipur, Delhi, Ahmedabad, Indore, Jaisalmer computerized reservation along with return ticket facility is available.
Mineral water is provided to the passengers travelling in Air Conditioned and Deluxe Bus services between Delhi and Jaipur. Breakfast (Gold Line Services) is served to the passengers travelling in Air Conditioned and Deluxe Bus services between Delhi and Jaipur. Sleeper coaches (Gray line) are introduced in the long distance night transit services like Jaipur, Udaipur, Ganganagar, Haridwar, Kota, Bikaner and Pilani.

Network 

RSRTC is connected to eleven nearby States/Union Territories viz. Madhya Pradesh, Uttar Pradesh, Punjab, Haryana, Gujarat, Maharashtra, Uttarakhand, Himachal Pradesh, Jammu-Kashmir, Delhi and Chandigarh through its various types of services.

Future Plans 

For the coming year, RSRTC has identified the following Key Focus Area for the benefits of its passengers:

1. Re-Introduction of Rural Transport Service as a means to provide connectivity between different villages and Tehsils.

2. End-to-End implementation of ERP to ensure provision of real time data and information related to ticketing, vehicle location, vehicle maintenance and expected time of arrival and departure of vehicles.

3. Development of State-of-the-Art Bus stands at Jaipur and Jodhpur and provision of additional passenger amenities such as dormitories, food plaza, baby feeding room etc. at all major Bus Stands of RSRTC.

4. Proper maintenance of RSRTC buses on mission mode to ensure cleanness and comfort in RSRTC buses.

5. Revamping of the Central Control Room to ensure time bound grievance redressal of the complaints received through toll Free No 18002000103, Control Room Land line & Mobile and WhatsApp.

For the benefit of Corporation, RSRTC intends to introduce the following Additional Revenue Management (ARM) measures:

1. Increase in Operational Kilometers.

2. Introduction of Dynamic Pricing:

3. Introduction of a new contract model based on revenue sharing for Contract Vehicles

4. Introduction of Electric Vehicles on Revenue Sharing Model:

5. Modernization and development of Bus Stations and Satellite terminals on Success Fee Model

6. Modernization and Strengthening of Workshops

7. Implementation of Digital Advertising

8. Development of Bus Stops on PPP Mode

Major Bus Depot 
 Abu Road
 Ahmedabad
 Ajmer
 Alwar
 Anoopgarh
 Banswara
 Baran, Rajasthan
 Barmer, Rajasthan
 Beawar
 Bharatpur, Rajasthan
 Bhilwara
 Bikaner
 Bundi
 Chittorgarh
 Churu, Rajasthan
 Dausa
 Deedwana
 Delhi ISBT
 Dholpur
 Dungarpur
 Falna
 Hanumangarh
 Hindaun City
 Indore
 Jaipur
 Jaisalmer
 Jalore
 Jhalawar
 Jhunjhunu
 Jodhpur
 Karauli
 Khetri
 Kota, Rajasthan
 Kotputli
 Lohagarh (Bharatpur)
 Matsya Nagar (Alwar)
 Nagaur
 Pali
 Phalodi
 Rajsamand
 Revdar
 Sardarshahar
 Sawai Madhopur
 Sikar
 Sirohi
 Sri Ganganagar
 Sri Madhopur
 Tijara
 Tonk
 Udaipur
 Vaishali Nagar (Jaipur)
 Vidhyadhar Nagar, Jaipur

See also
Jaipur City Transport Services Limited

References

External links 
 

Bus companies of India
Transport in Rajasthan
State agencies of Rajasthan
State road transport corporations of India
1964 establishments in Rajasthan
Government agencies established in 1964